William J. Todd Stewart was a Scottish professional football outside left who played in the Scottish League for Cowdenbeath, Motherwell, Albion Rovers and Alloa Athletic. He also played in the Football League for Manchester United. After his retirement from football, he managed South African club Clyde Pinelands.

Personal life 
After retiring from football, Stewart emigrated to South Africa.

Career statistics

Honours 
 Cowdenbeath Hall of Fame

References 

1910 births
Footballers from Glasgow
Scottish footballers
Cowdenbeath F.C. players
Manchester United F.C. players
Motherwell F.C. players
Year of death missing
Albion Rovers F.C. players
Alloa Athletic F.C. players
Scottish Football League players
English Football League players
Glasgow United F.C. players
Association football outside forwards
Scottish football managers
Scottish expatriate football managers
Scottish expatriate sportspeople in South Africa
Expatriate soccer managers in South Africa
Scottish Junior Football Association players